The Dayton City League is an OHSAA-sponsored athletic league that is entirely made up of schools located within Dayton, Ohio that are part of Dayton Public Schools.  

The league did not exist from 2002-2007 when the schools remaining after several closures and consolidations joined the Southwest Ohio Public League.  Beginning in 2015 and for football only, all five football-playing schools will rejoin the SOPL.

Members

Former members

References

Links
Dayton Public Schools
Dayton Public Schools Athletic Website

Ohio high school sports conferences
Sports teams in Dayton, Ohio